Byrum is a toponymic surname, a variant spelling of Byron, derived from Byram, North Yorkshire. Notable people with the surname include:

 Carl Byrum, American football player
 Curt Byrum, professional golfer
 Dianne Byrum, politician
 Dion Byrum, cornerback
 John Byrum, director
 Tom Byrum, professional golfer

See also 
 
 
 Biram (disambiguation), a variant spelling
 Biron (surname), a variant spelling
 Byram (surname), a variant spelling
 Byrom, a variant spelling

References 

English toponymic surnames